Alfredo Verzosa y Florentín (9 December 1877 - 27 June 1954) was the fourth native Filipino to be elevated as bishop of the Roman Catholic Church and the first from Northern Luzon – the first Ilocano. Together with Laura Latorre Mendoza, a widow and catechist, they founded the Congregation of the Missionary Catechists of the Sacred Heart (MCSH), a congregation focusing on the missions of education and administration within the church, especially of Catholic catechesis. His cause for beatification is currently underway, having been declared Servant of God by Pope Benedict XVI.

Early years and the seminary

Alfredo Verzosa y Florentín was born in Vigan, Ilocos Sur to Don Alejandro Verzosa and Doña Micaela Florentín of the “Gremio de Mestizos” (Mestizo Guild) of Vigan. Alfredo was the second of seven children. The Verzosa family was God-fearing and frequent mass-goers. They were close to the church for they were financial patrons of the Cathedral Church. 
 
The young Verzosa was reared to be pious, respectful, and humble; and began to show an interest in becoming a priest. Later, after his elementary schooling, he enrolled at the Conciliar Seminary of Nueva Segovia. He stayed at the seminary for three years before deciding to leave.

Verzosa transferred to the Colegio de san Juan de Letrán in Manila and there finished his “Segunda Enseñanza” (Secondary Education) obtaining his Bachelor of Arts. Restless, he consulted a Dominican Friar, who suggested he return to the seminary. During one of his vacations to Vigan, his elder sister told him that when he was living in Manila, she saw their mother waking up in the middle of the night, praying and shedding tears. Verzosa believed that he was the cause of his mother's distress for it has always been her wish to see him a priest.

Theological studies

Verzosa studied theology at the University of Sto. Tomás in Manila. As a seminarian, he received his Tonsure and the Four Minor Orders in Manila. That time was a period of chaos in both civil and ecclesiastical life in the Philippines. The nation was at war with Spainfighting for its independence. The church was not spared from the problem, some native priests became secret supporters of the revolution.

The Ilocano priest and prominent figure in the Filipinization Movement, Gregorio Aglipay served as Military Chaplain of the Aguinaldo Revolutionary Government. When the Bishop of Nueva Segovia, José Hevia Campomanes, was imprisoned in Cagayan, Aglipay went to him and presented a petition that he be appointed as Ecclesiastical Governor of Nueva Segovia. Campomanes was impressed with Aglipay and appointed him to the post. But it became clear that Aglipay's real objective was to convince the Filipino clergy to stand against Spain and support the revolution. Aglipay was summoned to Manila by the Metropolitan Archbishop but did not appear. Because of his position of the Civil Office as Military Chaplain from Aguinaldo, Aglipay was excommunicated for Usurpation of Jurisdiction. Later, he, together with some Filipino priests joined the newly established “Iglesia Filipina Independiente” (Philippine Independent Church).

The Diocese of Nueva Segovia was affected very much by the schism. Priests from the Province of Ilocos Norte, under Nueva Segovia at that time, defected to the new church and almost the whole population of that province followed their priests. This was the pastoral situation of Nueva Segovia at the arrival of the new bishop, Dennis Dougherty, in 1903. Among the first moves of Dougherty for Nueva Segovia was the ordination of new priests because many priests of his diocese defected to the new church.

Priestly ordination

Before finishing his theological studies, in 1904 Verzosa was ordained a priest by Dougherty. Verzosa was first assigned as priest-in-charge of the Vigan Cathedral. After some months, he was made priest-in-charge of the Parish of Santa. Eventually, he was appointed assistant priest to the priest Eulogio Alcid in the Parish of Bantay. Alcid is remembered in history as the priest who convoked the assembly of Ilocos Sur priests denying allegiance to any foreign bishop. This move could have been another danger if it was not quelled by Dougherty. 
 
As assistant priest in Bantay, Verzosa resided in the “Visita de san Ildefonso” (peripheral mission of san Ildefonso) as he prepared for its establishment as a parish in 1906.  The following year, Verzosa was made Parish Priest of Bantay. There, he had the difficult task to convincing people to return to Roman Catholicism. Bantay at this time was the home of numerous Aglipayans. It is related that when he was on a barrio mission, he was warned by the minister of another sect not to go to the barrios. Nevertheless, Verzosa insisted on going. The minister threw a spear at Verzosa which missed the priest but killed his horse. On another occasion, while serving as Parish Priest of Bantay, Verzosa was sent as missionary to the schismatic Ilocos Norte. He had to visit the towns and work for the revival of Roman Catholicism there. In 1915, while speaking in Batac, a young Agliyanan threw a stone which caught Verzosa in the chest, but did not interrupt his preaching.

Bishop of Lipa

In 1916, Rome appointed the 39-year old Verzosa as the first Filipino Bishop of the Diocese of Lipa, an area covering the Southern Tagalog Provinces of Batangas, Tayabas (Quezón), Laguna, Mindoro and Marinduque. He succeeded Giuseppe Petrelli who was appointed as new Apostolic Delegate to the Philippines. Verzosa was ordained bishop at the Cathedral of San Sebastián in Lipa by his predecessor, Archbishop Petrelli on January 20, 1917.

Verzosa arrived in Lipa enriched by his pastoral experience in Nueva Segovia. Learning from the perils of the Aglipayan schism, he believed that catechetics was the primary need at that time. He established catechetical centers and formed local catechists. It was said, that catechetical programs spread in the vast Diocese of Lipa like a wild fire. Catechism became the order of the day. A fruit of Verzosa's catechetical drive was the foundation in 1923 of the “Religiosas de María de la Enseñanza Cristiana” (Religious of Mary of the Christian Education), later named the “Misioneras Catequistas del Sagrado Corazón” or Missionary Catechists of the Sacred Heart. He also brought the Carmelite Fathers, Pauline Fathers, Pauline Sisters, and a number of other religious congregations to the Lipa diocese. Verzosa built schools, seminaries, catechetical centers and convents.

Apostolic administrator of Nueva Segovia
With the resignation of Peter Joseph Hurth as Bishop of Nueva Segovia, the Holy See appointed Verzosa as the Apostolic Administrator of the diocese. Sometime in January 1926, there was a rebellion of native priests assigned in Pangasinan, initiated by Hurth's Vicar General, Benigno Jimenez, who was serving in one of the parishes of the said province. Hurth suspended his Vicar General for living a life not aligned to priestly witnessing: concubinage. It was further reported that younger clerics took his act as an excuse to follow the same. His removal provoked a resistance from the clergy of Pangasinan. Stirred by Jimenez, the clergy accused Hurth of being partial for supporting the religious clergy over the diocesans, threatening him with a schism. This anti-religious sentiment of the native clergy was an old issue since the Spanish times and erupted during the Aglipayan Schism of 1902 as mentioned earlier.

Pangasinan crisis
Verzosa took over Nueva Segovia in February 1926. He focused on the Pangasinan crisis. He visited parishes, talked with the clergy, brought them to retreat and spent time living in the province. A story has it that there was a young priest suspended by Hurth for living with a concubine but without a child. Before Hurth resigned, the young priest asked for his pardon and was readmitted to the ministry. But he could not return to the ministry for the concubine, who made him work in the field for a living, preventing his return. On one occasion, on his way to Vigan, Verzosa passed by with his car in the field. He called the priest to run to his car and quickly brought the priest to Vigan, away from the concubine. He reinstated him in the ministry.

The Pangasinan crisis was quelled with the kind and charitable bearing of Verzosa. At the end of his term as Apostolic Administrator in 1927, he gave a good proposal for Pangasinan: a new diocese should be created out of the vast province. Verzosa's aim was to provide a closer pastoral care of the area. He proposed that the seat of the future diocese be in Lingayen. Hence, the following year 1928, the Holy See established the Diocese of Lingayen out of the civil Province of Pangasinan and some towns of Nueva Ecija and Tarlac. The Archbishop of Manila served as Apostolic Administrator of the new diocese till the appointment of its first bishop in 1929.

Divine Word Fathers
Also in 1926, he continued the negotiation for the Divine Word Fathers (SVD) to take over the reins of the Vigan Seminary. After the Jesuits ended their contract for the Vigan Seminary, they refused to renew it. The coming of the Divine Word Fathers to the Vigan Seminary was the solution of Verzosa to avoid its closure. Verzosa also invited the Holy Spirit Sisters to take over the Laoag Catholic School in Ilocos Norte in the same year 1926. They were sent there to educate young girls in this Aglipayan bailiwick.

The Holy See offered Verzosa to be Nueva Segovia's next bishop but he refused. He believed that he was more needed in the Diocese of Lipa with the programs and constructions he had initiated there. Verzosa served as Apostolic Administrator of Nueva Segovia till the arrival of the new bishop, Santiago Sancho in 1927.

Witnessing

Verzosa's colleagues, impressed with the purity of his vocation, elected him to key appointments such as Chairman of Catholic Action for the whole Philippines and Permanent Secretary of the Philippine Bishops. He most sought-after co-consecrator in the consecration of new bishops. Even the Apostolic Delegate, the archbishop William Piani, would always seek retreats with Verzosa in his residence.  A testimony to his exceptional piety.
 
He cared very much for his celibacy and chastity. As to the care of his priests, he helped financially priests from poor parishes. When a priest was found to be guilty of violating his celibacy, Verzosa would personally give retreat to that priest and wept with his priest. He was strong in reminding his clergy of fidelity to their vocation.

He was helping poor students to finish their studies. He used his stipends in funding their schooling. He believed in the importance of Catholic formation of the young. He founded many Catholic Schools in his vast diocese. He likewise founded seminaries. During his term in Lipa, the three levels of seminary formation were present in his diocese. He established a seminary in Lucena, one in san Pablo, Laguna and Lipa. He gave up his “palacio” in Lipa and remodeled it for a seminary. He, then, had to stay in a rented house within the city. 
 
Verzosa was not luxurious, he did not have his own car, he was wearing tattered clothing. Rich people in Lipa were generous in giving him gifts and Verzosa gave some of these to his house helpers. It was even testified that he did not have his own bank account. He lived in simplicity and was very generous to those in need. He even invented jobs so to accommodate fathers who had nothing for their family.

Verzosa in the first 25 years of his term in Lipa built churches, convents, monasteries and schools. This merited him the title as “Great Builder.” He used the money of his diocese for the establishment of these edifices aligned to evangelization. It was also commented that Lipa during his time was in a time of religious revival. 
 
These good fruits of his ministry in Lipa seemed to be preparations of the forthcoming trials in his life. In the early 1940s, as they were preparing for his Silver Jubilee as bishop, with a synod and inauguration of a new seminary in Brgy. Antipolo, Lipa, the war broke out. The synod could not push through and the seminary had to be closed down. During the difficult times of the war, numerous people were massacred and burned inside the seminary in Brgy. Antipolo.

World War II

During World War II, Verzosa risked his life helping women forced into prostitution by the Japanese military.  

The city of Lipa was very devastated by the bombings. Verzosa was already praying in his chapel and waiting for death to come. His secretary informed him that there was still time to evacuate. They proceeded to the cathedral and saw numerous people detained there. When the people were released, Verzosa had to take the leadership in leading the people towards American liberated lines. That was another difficult life for Verzosa. They travelled on foot amidst the perils of death. It became a news that Verzosa died in the bombings. At their arrival to their destination, when people saw him, they were all happy to have him alive.

Auxiliary bishop Alfredo Obviar

In this difficult time of the war, Verzosa asked the Holy See to give him a helper in the ministry. It was 1944 when the Vatican appointed his Vicar General, Alfredo Obviar as his Auxiliary Bishop. Obviar was very dear to Verzosa. He ordained him as priest in 1919 and assigned to him to parishes close to the diocesan seat. Obviar "possessed an extraordinary charism for organizing catechists as well as for teaching catechism most especially to the old folks". As parish priest of Lipa City, Obviar established many catechetical centers in the poblacion and the barrios. 

He took him as his secretary in his pastoral visits and exposed him to challenging tasks in the ministry including catechetics and the foundation of the Missionary Catechists of the Sacred Heart. Obviar would later found his own congregation patterned after the charism of the congregation founded by his superior. Verzosa and Obviar had good working relationship.
 
After the war, Verzosa again had to do the task of rebuilding the Diocese of Lipa, many churches, convents and schools were destroyed. He had to use his personal inheritance for the projects for the War Damage Fund was not enough. But there was a heavier wound to mend, the emotions of the victims of war caused by loss of loved ones, separation of family members, defilement of women of their dignity and the brutal mutilation and torture of men. They said that Lipa was lucky to have him during this time of restoration. The fatherly concern of Verzosa helped in the emotional and spiritual recovery of the people.

Carmel of Lipa

In 1946, the Carmelite nuns finally gave their nod to establish a house in Lipa. Verzosa gave the lot where the seminary used to stand, the place of the holocaust of hundreds of people during the war. It was in this monastery where an alleged apparition of the Blessed Virgin to a young postulant happened in 1948. The Lady allegedly declared to the postulant that she is the “Mediatrix of All Grace.” Thousands of pilgrims flocked to Lipa Carmel. Later, came the shower of rose petals believed to have come from nowhere. Verzosa, prudent as he was, went to Lipa from his residence in Batangas to warn the sisters not to spread the story of the alleged apparition. He told them to remove the newly carved image of the Mediatrix from public veneration as a commission does the investigation of the presumptive extraordinary occurrences. When Verzosa entered the locutory, he was greeted by a shower of rose petals said to have come from nowhere. He knelt down, prayed and astounded. He later ordered to put the image back to its former place. Since then, he became lenient over the coming of people to Carmel. However, Verzosa did not issue any public pronouncement on the veracity of the miracle for he entrusted the task to a commission.

Lipa under apostolic administration

In 1949, Verzosa received a mandate from Rome informing him that he is relieved of his juridical task as Ordinary of Lipa and the diocese is placed under Apostolic Administration. This was because his health, weakened by the trauma of the war, made him less fitted to the pastoral governance of a vast diocese.

He was humbly disposed to accept the will of the church. The young bishop Rufino Santos, Auxiliary Bishop of Manila was named Apostolic Administrator. The old bishop remained to stay in Batangas for two more years and eventually  filed his resignation as Bishop of the Diocese of Lipa. After the acceptance of his resignation, he was named by the Holy See as Titular Bishop of Capsa. A defunct diocese in Northern Africa that exists only in name.

Retirement

Verzosa decided to return to Vigan for his retirement. It was heard from him that when he was leaving Lipa, he utterred, “I’m still to become gold!” On his way home, he dropped by Lucena to bid goodbye to Obviar who was already then the Apostolic Administrator of Lucena. Obviar gave one of his priests to serve as Verzosa's chaplain in Vigan. The young priest Gregorio Salvatus was the one to whom the task was given. 
 
His retirement years in Vigan might have been the most difficult period in Verzosa's life. In his old age, he suffered depression, poverty and abandonment but he never complained. He was sustained only by his prayers. In a letter to the Carmelite Sisters of Lipa, he said, “Pray for me as I pray for the Carmel of Lipa that the Virgin may give us the strength and constancy to carry the cross of love that she has placed on our weak shoulders.”

Death

On Sunday, June 27, 1954, Salvatus administered last rites. He later said that Verzosa died "with the death of a just man". Verzosa was buried in a tomb for Bishops of Nueva Segovia.
 
After his death, claims of his sanctity circulated. A tribute to him was published some months after his death in the Boletín Eclesiástico de Filipinas, the interdiocesan bulletin of the Philippines, it was said, “We leave it to Rome to speak on the interior piety of the late Bishop Verzosa; but we would like to believe – from what we know and saw about him – that as he knocked at his Supreme Commander’s Headquarters, he was warmly received with more than five stars waiting for his crown.” Nearly twenty-five years after his death, at the election of the next native bishop from Ilocos Sur in 1979, the Archbishop of Nueva Segovia Juan Sison recalled Verzosa by saying, “After virtuously rendering pioneering job as Bishop of Lipa – died a saintly death in Vigan in 1954.” It was commented that “Heaven alone knows the depth of this prelate’s humility and faith in the Loving Father Who knows all. Truly, he was a holy priest of God!”

Cause of beatification and canonization
On January 11, 2013, led by Archbishop Ernesto Salgado, the Roman Catholic Archdiocese of Nueva Segovia opened his official cause for beatification. This was in response to the petition of the Missionary Catechists of the Sacred Heart. Fray Samsón Silloriquez was appointed as Postulator. At the opening of the Cause, Verzosa was given the title, Servant of God.

On November 17, 2014, the Vatican Congregation for the Causes of Saints has issued the nihil obstat in the process of the Servant of God's Beatification and Canonization. The Tribunal was headed by Salgado who was its judge till his retirement in 2013. He was replaced by Archbishop Marlo Peralta, the new Archbishop of Nueva Segovia, who noted that Verzosa's life was marked by obedience and humility. Gary Noel Formoso served as the Judge-Delegate with Santos Rabang as Defender of Justice and Gwendolyn Condor as Notary. On April 2, 2016, the Diocesan Inquiry ended.

After the submission of the papers of the Diocesan Inquiry, the Congregation for the Causes of Saints issued the “decree of validity” on June 2, 2017. This was followed by the appointment of Paul Pallath as the Relator of the Cause.

The Cause is now in the Roman Phase and the “positio,” the official paper of the Cause, is in the process of writing.

References

External links
Hagiography Circle
Archdiocese of Lipa website
Alfredo Verzosa, Bishop Emeritus of Lipa

1877 births
1954 deaths
20th-century Roman Catholic archbishops in the Philippines
Filipino Servants of God
20th-century venerated Christians
University of Santo Tomas alumni
People from Vigan
Roman Catholic bishops of Lipa